Usnea rubicunda, commonly known as the red beard lichen, is a type of arboreal lichen native to temperate regions in North, Central and South America, as well as Europe, Eastern Asia, and North Africa. This fruticose species forms hair-like hanging clusters that are orange to red in color. It is at risk of extirpation in Canada.

References

rubicunda
Lichen species
Lichens described in 1881
Lichens of North Africa
Lichens of Asia
Lichens of Central America
Lichens of Europe
Lichens of North America
Taxa named by James Stirton